was a village located in Tone District, northern Gunma Prefecture, Japan.

Geography
The Katashina River, a branch of Tone River, flows on the west side of the former village.

 Mountains: Mount Sukai, Mount Shukudōbō
 Rivers: Katashina River, Tani River

History
April 1, 1889 - Azuma Village was created from merger of Hirakawa, Otsukai, Ōyō, Anahara, Sonohara, Ōhara-Shinchō, Oigami, Takatoya and Chidori-Nitta due to implementation of Municipal System Law.
September 30, 1956 - Azuma was merged with Akagine, Tone District, to form Tone Village.
February 13, 2005 - Tone was merged into Numata City.

Scenic and Historic Places
 Fukiware Falls
 Oigami Hot Springs

See also
 List of dissolved municipalities of Japan

Azuma, Tone